Carlos Labbé Márquez (November 22, 1876 – October 17, 1941) was a Chilean bishop.

Life as a priest
He studied at the Seminary of Santiago and was ordained priest on December 23, 1899 . He served as pastor in Walls between 1901 and 1906. In Curepto between 1906 and 1911.

He was Bishop of Iquique from 1930 to 1941.

References

1876 births
1941 deaths
20th-century Roman Catholic bishops in Chile
Roman Catholic bishops of Iquique